RaboRonde Heerlen or Profronde van Heerlen is an elite men's and women's professional road bicycle racing event held annually in Heerlen, Netherlands. It's one of the largest post-Tour de France criteriums with about 50,000 spectators annually. The first edition was in 1990 and since 2013 the event also includes a women's race.

The race is organized by Stichting Cyclocross Heerlen on the first Friday after the Tour de France. Until 2009 the event was organized by Stichting Profronde Heerlen.

Honours

Men's

Source

Men's Time Trial

Source

Women's

Source

References

External links
 

Women's road bicycle races
Recurring sporting events established in 1990
1990 establishments in the Netherlands
Men's road bicycle races
Cycling in Heerlen